Hyperdrive is a 2019 American documentarian non-scripted auto racing reality television series on Netflix that is executive produced by Charlize Theron. The series follows elite racing drivers from across the globe competing against each other on one of the largest existing automotive courses.

The full season of Hyperdrive, consisting of 10 episodes, was released on August 21, 2019. As of July 2022, there are no plans to either renew the show for a second season or cancel it entirely by Netflix.

Format 
28 international competitors drive around a race track and attempt to navigate specific obstacles and perform maneuvers on a custom made "Hyperdrive" course. Throughout the season, the number of competitors is whittled down until there are six competitors remaining; the competitor who outlasts all others is declared the Hyperdrive champion.

The Hyperdrive course is a drifting course that includes a variable number of obstacles, each of which must be completed in the correct manner. Each obstacle has a series of targets that must be hit or a series of fixed elements that must be avoided. Time penalties are incurred for violating the obstacle's rules (e.g. not completing it within the time limit) or hitting a target in an illegal manner (which includes missing a target). The competition consists of a preliminary qualification round, a series of knockout rounds, and a final round.

The first four episodes are qualifying rounds with ten or twelve competitors competing per episode; there are five or six obstacles on the course. The three competitors with the fastest times in each of the first three episodes automatically advance to the knockout round, while the three competitors with the slowest times are eliminated, including any competitors that did not finish. For the next three episodes, another group of four to six new competitors replaced any competitors who had advanced or were eliminated, and they compete against the six competitors who finished between fourth and ninth place in the previous episode; this continues until all twelve qualification spots are filled.

A total of twelve competitors compete in the knockout rounds, where the difficulty of each obstacle is increased. In the first three knockout rounds, the number of competitors is reduced by two; the competitor having the slowest time is relegated to the wild-card round. The two competitors who are ranked just above the slowest competitor have to compete in a head-to-head race against each other; the competitor who finishes first in the race automatically advances to the next round. The five competitors who did not qualify for the fourth knockout round compete in the wild-card round, with the winner of the final head-to-head race in that round reentering the competition; the four competitors who lose their head-to-head races are eliminated. The fourth and fifth knockout rounds are played similarly to the previous three rounds (albeit with an increased amount of obstacles), but the loser of the head-to-head race is eliminated; this process continues until six competitors remain.

In the final round, the six competitors who had advanced from the fifth knockout round compete against each other in a course that has nine obstacles. The competitor who posts the fastest time in this round is declared the winner of the competition.

Presentation 
The show is hosted by Michael Bisping, Lindsay Czarniak, Mike Hill and Rutledge Wood.

Results 

 The contestant won Hyperdrive.
 The contestant moved onto the next round.
 The contestant came in the top 3 in a qualifying race and moved on to the knockout rounds.
 The contestant survived the head-to-head and moved onto the next round.
 The contestant was eliminated on that round.

Episodes

References

Episodes

External links 
 
 

2019 American television series debuts
English-language Netflix original programming